John Colquhoun may refer to:

 John Colquhoun (sportsman) (1805–1885), sportsman and Scots sportswriter
 John Colquhoun (footballer) (born 1963), Scottish football player
 John Campbell Colquhoun, British MP for Dunbartonshire, 1832–1835, Kilmarnock Burghs, 1837–1841, and Newcastle-under-Lyme, 1842–1847 
 John Frederick Colquhoun, World Scout Committee member
 Sir John Colquhoun, 1st Baronet (died c. 1650)
Sir John Colquhoun, 2nd Baronet (c. 1622–1676), of the Colquhoun baronets

See also
Colquhoun (surname)